Frederick Granville Mallin (4 March 1902 – September 1987) was an English boxer who competed for Great Britain in the 1928 Summer Olympics. He fought as Fred Mallin.

Boxing career
In 1928, he finished fourth in the middleweight class after losing the bronze medal bout to Léonard Steyaert. At the 1930 Empire Games he won the gold medal in the middleweight class after winning the final against Dudley Gallagher.

Mallin won the Amateur Boxing Association British middleweight title five times, when boxing out of the Eton Manor ABC. The feat saw him equal his older brother's (Harry Mallin) record of winning five titles.

He died in London.

References 

1902 births
1987 deaths
Boxers from Greater London
English male boxers
Middleweight boxers
Olympic boxers of Great Britain
Boxers at the 1928 Summer Olympics
Boxers at the 1930 British Empire Games
Commonwealth Games gold medallists for England
England Boxing champions
Commonwealth Games medallists in boxing
Medallists at the 1930 British Empire Games